Ugnu–Kuparuk Airport  is a private-use airport located in Kuparuk, Alaska, United States. It is privately owned by ConocoPhillips. which operates the Kuparuk oil field.

Facilities and aircraft
For the 12-month period ending December 31, 2001, the airport had 1,850 aircraft operations, an average of 5 per day: 95% general aviation and 5% air taxi.

Although most U.S. airports use the same three-letter location identifier for the FAA and IATA, Ugnu–Kuparuk Airport is assigned UBW by the FAA and UUK by the IATA.

References

External links
 FAA Alaska airport diagram (GIF)

Airports in North Slope Borough, Alaska
Privately owned airports